Gilles Mas (born 5 January 1961) is a French former professional racing cyclist. He rode in five editions of the Tour de France and two editions of the Vuelta a España.

References

External links
 

1961 births
Living people
People from Condrieu
French male cyclists
Sportspeople from Rhône (department)
Cyclists from Auvergne-Rhône-Alpes